Örebro Castle is a medieval castle fortification at Svartån  in Örebro County,  Sweden. It was expanded during the reign of the royal family Vasa (House of Vasa) and finally rebuilt about 1900.  Some of the rooms are used as classrooms for pupils from Karolinska gymnasiet.

History
The castle lies on an island in the river Svartån.
The name of Örebro comes from the small stones ("ör")  that the river transports. The second part of the word comes from the bridge ("bro") .

The oldest part of the castle, a defence tower, was erected in the latter half of the 13th century.  It was probably built during the reign of King Magnus IV of Sweden (1316–1374). In 1364, Albrecht von Mecklenburg (ca 1340–1412) captured a fortress in Örebro. That was probably a predecessor of today's castle, which was built on the small island within the Svartå river. The fortress is supposed to have consisted of a defence tower with a surrounding wall. The tower was added to in the 14th century to make a larger stronghold. Under King Charles IX of Sweden (1550–1611), the fortress was rebuilt into a Renaissance castle.  Since 1764, the castle has served as the residence of the governor of Örebro County.

References

External links

Örebro slott website

Castles in Örebro County
Official residences of Swedish county governors